An All-American team is an honorary sports team for a specific season composed of the best amateur players at each position—who in turn are given the honorific "All-America" and typically referred to as "All-American athletes", or simply "All-Americans". Although the honorees generally do not compete together as a unit, the term is used in American team sports to refer to players who are selected by members of the national media.

The College Football All-America Team is an honor given annually to the best American college football players at their respective positions. The original All-America team was the 1889 College Football All-America Team selected by Caspar Whitney and Walter Camp.  In 1950, the National Collegiate Athletic Bureau, which is the National Collegiate Athletic Association's (NCAA) service bureau, compiled the first list of All-Americans including first-team selections on teams created for a national audience that received national circulation with the intent of recognizing selections made from viewpoints that were nationwide.  Since 1952, College Sports Information Directors of America (CoSIDA) has bestowed Academic All-American recognition on male and female athletes in Divisions I, II, and III of the NCAA as well as National Association of Intercollegiate Athletics athletes, covering all NCAA championship sports.

The 2009 College Football All-America Team is composed of the following College Football All-American first teams: Associated Press (AP), Football Writers Association of America (FWAA), American Football Coaches Association (AFCA), Walter Camp Football Foundation (WCFF), The Sporting News (TSN), Sports Illustrated (SI), Pro Football Weekly (PFW), ESPN, CBS Sports (CBS), College Football News (CFN), Rivals.com, and Scout.com.

Currently, NCAA compiles consensus all-America teams in the sports of Division I-FBS football and Division I men's basketball using a point system computed from All-America teams named by coaches associations or media sources. The system consists of three points for first team, two points for second team and one point for third team. Honorable mention and fourth team or lower recognitions are not accorded any points. Football consensus teams are compiled by position and the player accumulating the most points at each position is recognized as a consensus first-team all-American.  Currently, the NCAA recognizes All-Americans selected by the AP, AFCA, FWAA, TSN, and the WCFF to determine consensus All-Americans.

Honorees' statistics

For the 2009 NCAA Division I FBS football season, the following players were unanimous first-team selections on the twelve nationwide lists exhibited below:  Eric Berry, Drew Butler, Joe Haden, Russell Okung, C. J. Spiller, Ndamukong Suh and Golden Tate. Of the unanimous selections, Spiller was the only player selected at multiple positions: running back by Pro Football Weekly and Kickoff returner by all other selection committees. In addition, Toby Gerhart, Jerry Hughes, Mark Ingram II, Rolando McClain and Colt McCoy were unanimous first-team selections by the five NCAA-sanctioned selectors.

Mike Johnson, Mike Iupati and Earl Thomas were selected to the most (10 each) first team lists without being unanimously selected by all five of the NCAA-sanctioned first team lists. Danario Alexander was selected to the four lists without being chosen to any of the NCAA-sanctioned first team lists, while Kellen Moore and Brandon Graham were each selected to three unsanctioned first team lists. Colt McCoy has the distinction of being selected to the fewest lists (8) while being selected to all five sanctioned first teams.

Zane Beadles, who was a 2009 second team Academic All-America selection, is the only player to make one of the 2009 College Football All-America Teams and the 2009 College Football Academic All-America Team.  Tim Tebow, who was a 2007 and 2008 College Football All-America Team selection, was a first team 2009 College Football Academic All-America Team selection.

Honorees

Academic All-America

The following players were selected to the University Division Academic All-America first and second teams.

See also
 2009 All-ACC football team
 2009 All-Big 12 Conference football team
 2009 All-Big Ten Conference football team
 2009 All-Pacific-10 Conference football team
 2009 All-SEC football team

Notes

All-American Team
College Football All-America Teams